is a railway station in Ogi, Saga Prefecture. It is operated by JR Kyushu on the Nagasaki Main Line.

Lines

Station layout 
The station consists of two side platforms serving two tracks. The station building is a brick structure resembling a traditional warehouse. Besides a staffed ticket windown, the waiting room doubles as an exhibition area featuring local products. Access to the opposite side platform is by means of a footbridge.

Management of the station has been outsourced to the JR Kyushu Tetsudou Eigyou Co., a wholly owned subsidiary of JR Kyushu specialising in station services. It staffs the ticket window which is equipped with a POS machine but does not have a Midori no Madoguchi facility.

Adjacent stations

Environs
Ogi City Hall
Saga Prefectural Ushizu High School
Ushizu Junior High School
Ushizu Post Office
National Route 34
National Route 207

History
In the next phase of expansion, the track was extended westwards with Takeo (today ) opening as the new western terminus on 5 May 1895. Ushizu was opened on the same day as an intermediate station along the new stretch of track. When the Kyushu Railway was nationalized on 1 July 1907, Japanese Government Railways (JGR) took over control of the station. On 12 October 1909, the station became part of the Nagasaki Main Line. With the privatization of Japanese National Railways (JNR), the successor of JGR, on 1 April 1987, control of the station passed to JR Kyushu.

Passenger statistics
In fiscal 2016, the station was used by an average of 808 passengers daily (boarding passengers only), and it ranked 190th among the busiest stations of JR Kyushu.

See also
 List of railway stations in Japan

References

External links

Ushizu Station (JR Kyushu)

Railway stations in Saga Prefecture
Nagasaki Main Line
Railway stations in Japan opened in 1896